Events in the year 1817 in India.

Events
National income - ₹11,450 million
 November – Third Anglo-Maratha War begins and continues through to 1818.
 April- Paika rebellion was led by Baksi Jagabandhu Bidyadhar against the East India Company.

Law

Births
 15 May – Debendranath Tagore, founder in 1848 of the Brahmo Religion (died 1905).
 17 October – Syed Ahmad Khan, founder in 1875 of the Aligarh Muslim University (died 1898).

References

See also

 
India
Years of the 19th century in India